Ivanovka is a rural locality (a selo) in Pervomaysky Selsoviet, Yegoryevsky District, Altai Krai, Russia. The population was 1 as of 2012. There is 1 street.

Geography 
Ivanovka is located 48 km northeast of Novoyegoryevskoye (the district's administrative centre) by road. Tishinka is the nearest rural locality.

References 

Rural localities in Yegoryevsky District, Altai Krai